Aliabad Rural District is in the Central District of Taft County, Yazd province, Iran. At the National Census of 2006, its population was 2,473 in 849 households. There were 2,349 inhabitants in 827 households at the following census of 2011. At the most recent census of 2016, the population of the rural district was 1,970 in 740 households. The largest of its 129 villages was Aliabad, with 715 people.

References 

Taft County

Rural Districts of Yazd Province

Populated places in Yazd Province

Populated places in Taft County